In Mandaeism, zidqa refers to alms or almsgiving. Mandaean priests receive regular financial contributions from laypeople, since priesthood is typically a full-time occupation. Zidqa is also offered to the poor and needy.

Other uses
The Mandaic term zidqa brika (literally "blessed oblation") refers to a ritual meal blessed by priests. An early self-appellation for Mandaeans is bhiri zidqa, meaning 'elect of righteousness'.

See also
Charity (Christian virtue)
Zakat in Islam
Sadaqah in Islam (Arabic cognate)
Tzedakah in Judaism (Hebrew cognate)
Dāna in Hinduism

References

Alms
Mandaeism
Mandaic words and phrases